K68 may refer to:
 a MTR bus line connecting Yuen Long Industrial Estate and Yuen Long Town Park in Hong Kong
 another designation for the star Holmberg IX
 Garnett Municipal Airport FAA LID
 one of the indexes of the great dodecicosahedron, a uniform polyhedron

K-68 may refer to :
 K-68 (Kansas highway), a road in the US State of Kansas
 K-68 trailer, a 7-ton, 2 axle U.S. Signal Corps vehicle associated with SCR-268 radar station